Pabellón Island is the southernmost of two islands which lie close off the north tip of Omega Island and mark the south side of the western entrance to Andersen Harbor in the Melchior Islands, Palmer Archipelago. The island was roughly surveyed by DI personnel in 1927 and named by the Argentine expedition during a survey of these islands in 1946–47. They erected a mast on this island from which they flew the Argentine national colors (pabellón).

See also
 Composite Antarctic Gazetteer
 List of Antarctic and sub-Antarctic islands
 List of Antarctic islands south of 60° S
 SCAR
 Territorial claims in Antarctica

References

 

Islands of the Palmer Archipelago